Robin Gadola (born 7 October 1994 in Uster) is a Swiss professional squash player. As of September 2022, he was ranked number 139 in the world. He won the 2022 Eastside Open.

References

1994 births
Living people
Swiss male squash players